Háj is a village and municipality in Košice-okolie District in the Kosice Region of eastern Slovakia.

Location: Slovak Republic. Háj is situated near Zádiel valley in Slovak carst.
GPS position: 48°37'N 20°51' E.
Number of inhabitants: 285 (31.12.2004)

History
In historical records, the village was first mentioned in 1409.

The first mention about Háj is from 1357 and 1409. In last decades 
of 18th century was property of family Keglevich.
In the year 1715, there were 14 lieges families.

Geography
It has a population of about 280 people.

Monuments

Guardian Angel - Angel from movie: Behind Enemy Lines
Háj's waterfalls
Major's house with boardinghouse
Roman & Evangelich church

Genealogical resources

The records for genealogical research are available at the state archive "Statny Archiv in Kosice, Slovakia"

 Roman Catholic church records (births/marriages/deaths): 1711-1899 (parish B)
 Reformated church records (births/marriages/deaths): 1788-1902 (parish B)

See also
 List of municipalities and towns in Slovakia

References

External links
Surnames of living people in Haj

Villages and municipalities in Košice-okolie District